Suxibuzone is an analgesic used for joint and muscular pain.  It is a prodrug of the non-steroidal anti-inflammatory drug (NSAID) phenylbutazone, and is commonly used in horses.

References

Pyrazolidindiones
Carboxylate esters
Nonsteroidal anti-inflammatory drugs
Veterinary medicine
Equine medications